Southern Discomfort may refer to:

 Southern Discomfort (Rita Mae Brown novel), a novel released in 1982 by Rita Mae Brown
 Southern Discomfort (Eyehategod album), an album released in 2000 by sludge metal band Eyehategod
 Southern Discomfort (Rehab album), is an album released in 2000 by rock band Rehab
 Southern Discomfort (Fabian Society pamphlets), a series of  pamphlets that examined attitudes to the British Labour Party in the south of England
 Southern Discomfort Roller Derby, a men's roller derby league based in London
 "Southern Discomfort", an episode of the seventh season of The Real Housewives of Atlanta, an American reality television series